Amphicteinae is a subfamily of polychaete worms in the family Ampharetidae. It was originally established as a tribe, with eight genera, but was elevated to subfamily-level with a reduced number of genera in 2020.  Two species, Hypaniola kowatewskii and Hypania invalida, are known to feed on blue-green algae.

Genera 
The subfamily comprises the following genera:

 Hobsonia Banse, 1979
 Hypania Ostroumoff, 1897
 Hypaniola Annenkova, 1927
 Noanelia Desbruyeres & Laubier, 1977

References 

Terebellida
Protostome subfamilies